Kayvon Webster (born February 1, 1991) is a former American football cornerback. He played college football at South Florida and was drafted by the Denver Broncos in the third round of the 2013 NFL Draft. He has also played for the Los Angeles Rams and Houston Texans, and won Super Bowl 50 as a member of the Broncos.

High school career
A native of Miami, Florida, Webster attended Monsignor Edward Pace High School in Miami Gardens, Florida, where he was a letterman in football and track. In football, he saw action on both sides of the ball and as a return specialist and was a two-time first-team All-Dade selection. During his junior season, he caught 30 passes for 500 yards with eight touchdowns on offense, while also adding 65 tackles, four sacks, seven forced fumbles and 10 fumble recoveries on defense. Academically, he carried a 3.0 GPA.

In addition to football, Webster was a standout track & field athlete, Webster was one of the state's top performers in the sprinting events. He earned All-Dade County First-team 3A track and field honors in 2007 and All-Dade County First-team 3A football honors in 2008. He was tabbed All-American by Track & Field News in the 4 × 100 m in 2009. He led the Pace Spartans 4 × 100 m relay team to three straight Florida 2A state championships his sophomore and junior seasons, and posted the fastest time in the nation in the 4 × 100 m relay with a time of 40.54 seconds as a senior, setting the state meet record in the process. He took silver in the 100 meters at the 2009 Region 4 meet, with a time of 10.67 meters. Additionally, he was also timed at 4.4 seconds in the 40-yard dash and posted a 245-pound bench press.

Regarded as a three-star recruit by Rivals.com, Webster was rated as the 28th-best safety in the nation, 29th according to Scout.com. He was also ranked as the 32nd-best prospect as an athlete by ESPN.com. He chose USF over scholarship offers from Miami, Florida and Auburn, among others.

College career
Webster attended the University of South Florida, where he played college football for the South Florida Bulls football team from 2009 to 2012.  He was a second-team All-Big East Conference selection in 2011.  He graduated from South Florida with a bachelor's degree in health science in December 2012. In 2012, Webster racked up a career-high 81 tackles (61 solo) during his senior year with 3 forced fumbles. He left the program making 190 total tackles and was ranked 12th on the program's all-time list with 49 career games played.

In addition to football, Webster competed as a sprinter at USF, where he competed as a sophomore and junior. In 2010, he qualified for the BIG EAST Championships in the 100m and 200 meters. He earned All-Big East honors after placing 3rd in the 4 × 100 m relay event at the BIG EAST Championships in a school record of 40.75 seconds. In 2011, he took fifth in the 60 meters at the BIG EAST Championships, with a time of 6.91 seconds. He was a member of the 4 × 100 m relay that placed 2nd at the BIG EAST Championships with a time of 40.77 seconds, nearly breaking the previous record. He recorded a career-best time of 6.83 seconds in the 60-meter dash at the BIG EAST Conference Championships. His personal-best time in the 100 meters came at the USF Collegiate Invitational in 2012, where he took silver with a time of 10.5 seconds.

Professional career

Denver Broncos
Webster was selected 90th overall by the Denver Broncos in the third round of the 2013 NFL Draft.

In a win against the Dallas Cowboys in Week 5 of the 2013 season, Webster recorded his first career forced fumble, when he stripped the football from Dez Bryant, which was subsequently recovered by safety Duke Ihenacho. In the very next game against Jacksonville, Webster intercepted quarterback Chad Henne, to get the first interception of his career.

Webster played a key role in the special teams unit during the postseason. He received a game ball on January 17, 2016, after pinning Pittsburgh at the 3-yard line in Denver's 23-16 divisional round victory. Webster was a team captain in the AFC Championship, and the speedster continued to make an impact on special teams. He dove and scooped up a Britton Colquitt punt in front of the goal line that was downed at the New England 4-yard line, helping to preserve the victory. On February 7, 2016, Webster was part of the Broncos team that won Super Bowl 50. In the game, the Broncos defeated the Carolina Panthers by a score of 24–10. Webster was again a team captain and he played 26 snaps on defense. In addition, he was on the field for 78% of Denver's special teams plays, including tackling Ted Ginn after a Colquitt punt for a 1-yard loss.

Webster was placed on injured reserve on December 28, 2016, after suffering a concussion in Week 16.

Los Angeles Rams
On March 13, 2017, Webster signed a two-year contract with the Los Angeles Rams. He started 11 games in his first season as a Ram before suffering a ruptured Achilles in Week 14. He was placed on injured reserve on December 11, 2017.

On April 6, 2018, Webster was released by the Rams due to a failed physical.

Houston Texans
On August 27, 2018, Webster signed a one-year contract with the Houston Texans. He was placed on injured reserve on October 9, 2018, with a quadriceps injury. He was activated off injured reserve on December 22, 2018, but was placed back on reserve two days later after re-injuring his thigh.

New Orleans Saints
On June 10, 2019, Webster signed with the New Orleans Saints. He was released during final roster cuts on August 30, 2019.

Washington Redskins
The Washington Redskins signed Webster on December 17, 2019. He was released on March 23, 2020.

References

External links
Los Angeles Rams bio
Denver Broncos bio
South Florida Bulls bio

1991 births
Living people
Monsignor Edward Pace High School alumni
Players of American football from Miami
American football cornerbacks
American football return specialists
South Florida Bulls football players
Denver Broncos players
Los Angeles Rams players
Houston Texans players
New Orleans Saints players
Washington Redskins players